The Braye is a river of France, and a right tributary of the river Loir. Among its tributaries are the Grenne, Anille and Tusson. It flows into the Loir near Pont-de-Braye, in Lavenay.

Places along the river
 Sarthe: Vibraye 
 Loir-et-Cher: Souday, Sargé-sur-Braye, Savigny-sur-Braye 
 Sarthe: Bessé-sur-Braye, 
 Loir-et-Cher: Sougé, Couture-sur-Loir 
 Sarthe: Lavenay

References

Rivers of France
Rivers of Loir-et-Cher
Rivers of Eure-et-Loir
Rivers of Sarthe
Rivers of Centre-Val de Loire
Rivers of Pays de la Loire